Choorayi Kanaran (1812-1876) was the first Deputy Collector of India. He was born into a prominent family. He was also the first Municipal Chairman of Kerala.

Biography
Kanaran was born in 1812, the son of Kummai Choi, a jailer and Thiyyar family in Thalassery Kerala. At the age of 17.  Work was the norm at the time. He remained in that position until 1832. Many of the British officials were Telugus and North Indians. They also had an excellent position in governance.  So Kanaran studied Tamil, Telugu and Hindi. Gundert was educated in Malayalam and Sanskrit by his in  Uracherry Gurukkals, where he taught Malayalam and Sanskrit. He appointed Kanaran as the court clerk. Judge Strange, who left Gundert's bungalow in Illinois to live in, also liked Kanaran's work ethic. He appointed Kanaran as the head of the court. As a result, in 1859, Kanaran was appointed Deputy Collector and Magistrate of the South Malabar Region first deputy collector in India. He appointed Deputy Collector, Uppot Kannan and after another Judge EK Krishnan is appointed.

References

1812 births
1876 deaths
Indian politicians
ml:ചൂരയിൽ കണാരൻ